Rhaeticus can refer to:

Georg Joachim Rheticus, a mathematician
Rhaeticus, a lunar crater named after the mathematician